Nilenthi Nimal Siripala de Silva MP (born 6 September 1944) is a Sri Lankan politician currently serving as the Minister of Ports, Shipping and Aviation and former Cabinet Minister of Transport and Civil Aviation in 15th Parliament of Sri Lanka. He was the former Leader of the Opposition, former Minister of Irrigation and Water Resources Management and former Leader of the House.

He is a member of the Sri Lanka Freedom Party and a Member of Parliament representing the Badulla District.

Early life and education
De Silva born to a family of teachers in Badulla. He was educated at Nalanda College, Colombo where he was a member of the college debating team. He entered Colombo Law College in 1966 and qualified as a proctor in 1971.

Early career
Having started his legal practice in 1971, de Silva was active in politics from his student years, having started the Sri Lanka Freedom Party Law Students Association. He supported the Sirima Bandaranaike in a campaign in the 1970 general election. He went to the United Kingdom in 1975, and qualified as a solicitor. He return to Ceylon over land in 1978, and assisted Bandaranaike in her defense in the Special Presidential Commission was appointed by President J. R. Jayawardene to investigate allegations against Bandaranaike for abuses of power during her tenure as Prime Minister.

Political career
He entered parliament in 1989 having been elected from the Colombo Electoral District in the 1989 general election and was re-elected from Colombo till 2000, when he was elected from Badulla Electoral District and had been re-elected consecutively till the present. He is the Assembly President of the World Health Organization.

Assassination attempt
On 4 July 1996 De Silva escaped with injuries in an attempted assassination by a LTTE female suicide bomber at the Stanley Road in Jaffna. This incident took place minutes after the Minister declared open a branch of Building Materials Corporation (BMC) in Jaffna. Brigadier Ananda Hamangoda (Jaffna Sector Commander), Ranjith Godamuna (Chairman, Lanka Cement) and 21 others were killed with more than 50 injured in the explosion.

See also
Cabinet of Sri Lanka

References

Sources
Biographies of Present Members

1944 births
Living people
Government ministers of Sri Lanka
Leaders of the Opposition (Sri Lanka)
Sinhalese lawyers
Sri Lankan Buddhists
Ceylonese proctors
20th-century Sri Lankan lawyers
Alumni of Nalanda College, Colombo
Alumni of Ceylon Law College
Members of the 9th Parliament of Sri Lanka
Members of the 10th Parliament of Sri Lanka
Members of the 11th Parliament of Sri Lanka
Members of the 12th Parliament of Sri Lanka
Members of the 13th Parliament of Sri Lanka
Members of the 14th Parliament of Sri Lanka
Members of the 16th Parliament of Sri Lanka
People from Badulla
Housing ministers of Sri Lanka
Posts ministers of Sri Lanka
Telecommunication ministers of Sri Lanka
Social affairs ministers of Sri Lanka
Failed assassination attempts in Sri Lanka